Anton Obholzer (born 29 June 1968) is a British rower. He competed in the men's eight event at the 1988 Summer Olympics.

References

1968 births
Living people
British male rowers
Olympic rowers of Great Britain
Rowers at the 1988 Summer Olympics
Sportspeople from Cape Town